Exia Edwards (née Shelford, born 12 November 1975) is a former New Zealand rugby union player, representing  and Bay of Plenty. She made her international debut at the 1998 Rugby World Cup in the Netherlands. She was also part of two other successful Rugby World Cup's in 2002 and 2006.

In 1999, Shelford scored a try when the Black Ferns beat the United States 65–5 at Palmerston North. At the 2005 Canada Cup she scored a try in the 30–9 victory over Scotland at Ottawa.

Shelford also played rugby league for the New Zealand Māori women's team and netball for Bay of Plenty.

References

1975 births
Living people
New Zealand women's international rugby union players
New Zealand female rugby union players
Female rugby union players